The Caravan is an Indian English-language, long-form narrative journalism magazine covering politics and culture.

History  
In 1940, Vishwa Nath launched Caravan as the first magazine from the Delhi Press; it went on to establish itself as a leading monthly for the elites but closed in 1988. 

It was again revived in 2009 by Anant Nath, the grand son of Vishwa Nath; Nath was deeply impressed by publications like The Atlantic, Mother Jones etc. during his graduation from Columbia University and sought for The Caravan to be a home for S. Asia's rich literary talents. In Nath's words, "the idea was [] to have a magazine on politics, art, and culture, with a liberal bend of mind." A few months later, Vinod Jose was roped in as the executive editor; drawing inspiration from long-form American magazines such as Harper's and The New Yorker, he designed the magazine as the home for New Journalism in India. The establishment was successful and its earliest issues featured a host of giants in S. Asian Anglophone cannon — Pankaj Mishra, Arundhati Roy, and Fatima Bhutto among others. 

Gradually, both Nath and Jose planned to cover stories that were ignored by mainstream media — Siddhartha Deb notes the magazine to have simultaneously carried traits of being a newsweekly, book review forum, and a litzine, during those days. By 2010, the journal had become a monthly and the print-circulation exceeded 40,000; Jonathan Shainin joined the same year as an associate editor. Beginning 2014, with the rise of Narendra Modi in national politics, the magazine has become almost exclusively focused on politics — Nath explains this as a product of mainstream media's increasing reticence to be critical of the government. 

, the magazine employs 38 people and the website gets about 1.5 million pageviews per month.

Reception 
Jose's profile of Narendra Modi in the issue of March, 2012 won international acclaim and was referenced to by The Washington Post, The Wall Street Journal, The Guardian, Le Monde, and The New York Times. Dexter Filkins writing for The New Yorker in 2019, noted The Caravan to be the most prominent among the few media outlets who dared to provide critical coverage of the incumbent Bharatiya Janata Party government notwithstanding state-intimidation. 

In Summer 2020, Virginia Quarterly Review commissioned a feature on the magazine, which introducing it as a publication committed to "protecting India’s tradition of democracy and religious pluralism", reiterated Filkin's observation and emphasized the relevance of the publication at a time when the traditional mainstream media had all but buckled before the government. That the Caravan did not receive advertisements from the government, it was not possible for the government to use the traditional "carrot and stick" approach.

Awards

Individual journalists 
Multiple journalists have received awards for their reportage published in The Caravan. 

In 2010, Mehboob Jeelani won a Ramnath Goenka Award for his profile of Syed Ali Geelani. In 2011, Jose won a Ramnath Goenka Award for his profiles of Prime Minister Manmohan Singh and DMK patriarch M. Karunanidhi; two years later, he was conferred with the Osborn Elliott Prize by the Asia Society for two articles — one on the rebranding of Narendra Modi after the Gujarat Riots, and the other on media ethics. In 2011, Christophe Jaffrelot had also won the Ramnath Goenka Award for a series of op-eds. In 2012, Samanth Subramanian was conferred with Red Ink Award in the category of political reporting as well as media reporting by the Mumbai Press Club for his profiles of Subramanian Swamy and Samir Jain respectively. 

In 2014, the publication swept Red Ink Awards — Dinesh Narayanan won two in the category of political reporting for a profile of Mohan Bhagwat and in the category of business reporting for a profile of Jignesh Shah, Leena Gita Reghunath won the one in the category of crime reporting for a profile of Swami Aseemanand, Salil Tripathi won the one in the category of human rights reporting for a discussion of the 1971 war-crimes in Bangladesh, Nikita Saxena won the one in the category of health reporting, and Rahul Bhatia won the one in the category of sports reporting for a profile of N. Srinivasan. Bhatia also won a Ramnath Goenka Award for the same article.

In 2018, Nileena M S won the ACJ Journalism Award in the category of investigative reporting for detailing the rampant corruption in the allocation of coal-blocks in Chhattisgarh and Rajasthan. The same year,  Reghunath won a Red Ink Award for her reporting of gender-biases in Malayalam television under the women empowerment category while Aruna Chandrasekhar won another in the environment category for reporting on the tribal opposition to bauxite mining in Orissa. In 2019, Sagar won Red Ink Award in the category of political reporting for investigative reporting on the Rafale scam while Zishaan A Latif won a Ramnath Goenka Award for documenting the struggles of inclusion in NRC. In 2020, Prabhjit Singh and Arshu John's probings into the Delhi riots won them the ACJ Journalism Award in the category of investigative reporting. In 2021, Sagar won Red Ink Award in the category of crime reporting for his fact-checking of claims made by Central Bureau of Investigation in the context of Muzaffarpur shelter case.

Publication 
In 2021, the publication was conferred with the Louis M. Lyons Award for Conscience and Integrity in Journalism by the Nieman Foundation for Journalism's class of the year at Harvard University; the citation highlighted Caravan's "commitment to conscience and integrity" notwithstanding intimidatory tactics by the state.

Lawsuits and intimidation 
In addition to receiving threatening messages, the magazine has been sued repeatedly for alleged defamation. These lawsuits are costly and typically take years to fight in court. In 2011, the magazine was the subject of a Rs 50 crore defamation suit by the Indian Institute of Planning and Management after it featured a profile of its head, Arindam Chaudhuri.  During the years-long lawsuit, the magazine was ordered to take the article off its website.  In 2018, the High Court allowed the magazine to re-publish the article, but the gag order was partly reinstated by a different court two months later.

The magazine was issued legal notices in April 2013 regarding its May cover story about Attorney General Goolam Essaji Vahanvati but the top three editors decided to continue with its publication.

In 2015, The Caravan was served a legal notice by the Essar Group because the magazine described the business and the family that runs it unfavorably, including evidence that the business gave iPads to 195 journalists, government employees, and politicians. Essar later filed a 250 crore civil defamation suit against the magazine; the business did not deny any of the facts presented in the magazine article.

In 2021, many journalists and politicians who reported about the death of Navreet Singh during the 2021 Farmers' Republic Day parade were charged with sedition by the Delhi Police and the police departments of three Bharatiya Janata Party–ruled states. The police cases were filed against editor and founder Paresh Nath, editor Anant Nath, executive editor Vinod K. Jose and one unnamed person. Those charged also included Congress MP Shashi Tharoor, India Today journalist Rajdeep Sardesai, National Herald senior consulting editor Mrinal Pande and Qaumi Awaz editor Zafar Agha. Varadarajan has called the police FIR "malicious prosecution". The Press Club of India (PCI), the Editors Guild of India, the Press Association, the Indian Women's Press Corps (IWPC), the Delhi Union of Journalists and the Indian Journalists Union in a joint press conference asked the sedition law to be scrapped. The Editors Guild of India spoke against invoking of the sedition charge on journalists. The guild termed the FIRs as an "attempt to intimidate, harass, browbeat and stifle the media".

References

External links
 
 U.S. Library of Congress entry: ; archived web site lcwaN0030146

1940 establishments in India
Cultural magazines
English-language magazines published in India
Magazines established in 1940
Magazines disestablished in 1988
Magazines established in 2009
Magazines published in Delhi
Monthly magazines published in India
Political magazines published in India